Roxane Thompson (born July 9, 1964) is an American sports shooter. She competed in the women's 25 metre pistol event at the 1992 Summer Olympics.

References

External links
 

1964 births
Living people
American female sport shooters
Olympic shooters of the United States
Shooters at the 1992 Summer Olympics
People from Sandpoint, Idaho
Pan American Games medalists in shooting
Pan American Games bronze medalists for the United States
Shooters at the 1991 Pan American Games
Medalists at the 1991 Pan American Games
21st-century American women